Thamer Mohammed (Arabic:ثامر محمد) (born 10 October 1984) is an Emirati footballer.

External links

References

Emirati footballers
1984 births
Living people
Al Jazira Club players
Al-Wasl F.C. players
Al-Shaab CSC players
Baniyas Club players
Al Ahli Club (Dubai) players
Al-Ittihad Kalba SC players
UAE Pro League players
Association football defenders